2C-AL is a drug from the substituted phenethylamine family which acts as an agonist of the 5-HT2A receptor, with an EC50 of 2.15nM at 5-HT2A vs 77.71nM at 5-HT2B, and produces a head-twitch response in animal studies. It was first discussed as a hypothetical compound in Daniel Trachsel's 2013 review of the field after his successful synthesis of the related compounds 2C-V and 2C-YN, and finally synthesised by a team at Gilgamesh Pharmaceuticals in 2020 using a different synthetic route from that employed by Trachsel.

See also 
 2C-CP
 2C-IP
 2C-P
 2C-T-16
 Allylescaline
 3C-AL

References 

Designer drugs
Psychedelic phenethylamines
Serotonin receptor agonists
Methoxy compounds
Allyl compounds